Coşkun Aral (born May 1, 1956) is a Turkish war correspondent, photo journalist, television journalist  and documentary film producer.

Life and work
Aral was born on May 1, 1956 in Siirt, Turkey. Aral finished the secondary school and the high school in Istanbul. In 1974, he began photo journalism career in the newspapers Günaydın and Gün. He transferred to the daily Ekonomi ve Politika in 1976.

Aral gained recognition by the international press with the photos he shot during the Taksim Square massacre incident occurred on May 1, 1977, the Labour Day in Istanbul. His photos were distributed by the French photo agency Sipa Press and published in the news magazines Time and Newsweek. He became then the Turkish correspondent of the agency while he was serving for the Turkish News Agency and the newspapers Milliyet and Hürriyet as a freelance photographer.

In 1980, Coşkun Aral was tasked by the Sipa Press for the first time abroad Turkey. From then on, he continuously worked in the most conflict-ridden parts of the world such as Lebanon, Iran, Iraq, Afghanistan, Northern Ireland, Chad and Far East. He covered the 1982 anti-government street demonstrations in Gdańsk, Poland organized by underground Solidarity. The world's first ever interview with terrorists, who hijacked the airliner on October 14, 1980 he was also on board, brought him domestic and international recognition and awards. Aral was also assigned to Iran and Iraq to take photos during the Iran–Iraq War in 1982. Archived photos of him showing the political violence in Turkey before the 1980 Turkish coup d'état were published in the cover of Newsweek and L'Express as well as in many other news magazines. He continued his profession as a photojournalist, serving the weeklies Time, Newsweek, Paris Match, Stern and Época.

In 1986, Coşkun Aral entered additionally into a career as a television war correspondent taking part in the news show of 32. Gün (The 32nd Day") by Mehmet Ali Birand. The news show Haberci ("The Reporter"), he produces and directs, is broadcast in Turkish and also in international television channels. He is co-founder and the director general of Turkey's first documentary and travel channel İZ TV. Aral continues to film documentaries around the world. Aral exhibited his photos and collected some of them in books published internationally.

Çoşkun Aral is married to Müge Aral. The couple has a daughter named Deniz.

References

1956 births
Living people
People from Siirt
Turkish photojournalists
Turkish war correspondents
Turkish television journalists
Turkish film producers
Turkish non-fiction writers
Hürriyet people
Milliyet people
Günaydın (newspaper) people